The Gakona Roadhouse is a historic traveler service facility in Gakona, Alaska, at mile 205 of the Glenn Highway.  It is a 1-1/2 log structure with a gabled roof covered in corrugated metal. A shed-roof addition extends to the main block's east side.  The roadhouse was built c. 1904, during the construction by the United States Army of the Trans-Alaska Military Road between Valdez and Eagle.  This roadhouse was strategically located at a place where that road diverged from the old Eagle Trail, used by miners to reach the gold rush fields of the Yukon River.  The original 1904 structure is used for storage; the present roadhouse facilities are provided by later (1920s) structures.

The roadhouse was listed on the National Register of Historic Places in 1977.

See also
National Register of Historic Places listings in Copper River Census Area, Alaska

References

1905 establishments in Alaska
Buildings and structures on the National Register of Historic Places in Copper River Census Area, Alaska
Hotel buildings completed in 1905
Hotel buildings on the National Register of Historic Places in Alaska
Historic district contributing properties in Alaska
Log buildings and structures on the National Register of Historic Places in Alaska